Steven Jerome Carter (born December 3, 1964) is an American former Major League Baseball player from Charlottesville, Virginia who appeared in 14 games for the Pittsburgh Pirates from 1989 to 1990. A 1983 graduate of Albemarle High School, Carter was drafted by the Pittsburgh Pirates in the 17th round of the 1987 amateur draft out of the University of Georgia.

Carter is now is the Acting Executive Director of the Parks and Recreation Foundation for Maryland National Capital Park and Planning Commission.

References
 http://www.pgparks.com/About-Parks-and-Recreation/Leadership.htm

External links

1964 births
Pittsburgh Pirates players
Baseball players from Virginia
Sportspeople from Charlottesville, Virginia
Living people
Watertown Pirates players
Iowa Cubs players
African-American baseball players
American expatriate baseball players in Mexico
Acereros de Monclova players
Augusta Pirates players
Buffalo Bisons (minor league) players
Charlotte Knights players
Harrisburg Senators players
Indianapolis Indians players
Salem Buccaneers players
Toledo Mud Hens players
Tucson Toros players
21st-century African-American people
20th-century African-American sportspeople